is a Japanese anime television series produced by Sunrise and directed by Seiji Mizushima. The series aired on MBS between April and June 2012. A manga adaptation illustrated by Tatsuhiko was serialized in Square Enix's Young Gangan magazine between January 2012 and March 2013.

Plot
At a Shinto shrine in Shimoda, there is a large rock. It is said that if four close friends gather around the rock and they all wish for the same thing, that wish will come true. As four friends, Natsumi, Saki, Yuka and Rinko, gather around the rock like they used to in their childhood, they soon find the rock can indeed grant people's wishes. With only a short amount of time before Saki is due to transfer schools, the girls spend a summer filled with magic.

Characters

Main characters

The member of her school's tennis club, who is often quite stubborn but cares deeply about her friends, especially Saki.

Natsumi's best friend and next door neighbor who is to transfer schools due to her parents moving to Tokyo. She doesn't tend to believe in supernatural things. Has dreams of entering the tennis championship.

A hyperactive girl who admires idols, especially the idol group Four Season. She constantly beckons everyone to work towards the goal of becoming an idol group together. She works at her family's hot spring inn.

A laid back girl with simple thoughts who is often supporting Yuka. She works as a shrine maiden at a shrine where the magical rock lies. Whenever she has a fever, she sees whales flying around.

Supporting characters

Natsumi's mother.

Natsumi's younger brother.

One of Daiki's friends. He has allegedly seen Natsumi and her friends flying in the sky, believing them to be witches.

One of Daiki's friends.

Yuka's cousin and a member of the school baseball team who occasionally makes deliveries to the inn Yuka works at. Yuka has a crush on him, but he himself has a thing for Saki.

A boyish looking girl who lives with her twin sister, Chiharu, on an island in Tokyo where Saki is due to move. She is a bit hostile towards outsiders as Saki's parents are replacing the doctor she admired so much.

Media

Manga
A manga adaptation, based on the anime and illustrated by Tatsuhiko, was serialized in Square Enix's Young Gangan magazine between January 20, 2012 and March 15, 2013. Three tankōbon volumes were released between May 25, 2012 and March 25, 2013.

Anime
The anime television series was produced by Sunrise and directed by Seiji Mizushima. The screenplay was written by Tatsuhiko Urahata, and the chief animator Yuichi Tanaka based the character design used in the anime on Hidari's original concept. The sound director was Hiromi Kikuta, and the soundtrack was composed by Nijine and Masumi Itō. The series aired on MBS from April 6 to June 29, 2012. A short original video animation episode was released on August 29, 2012. Sphere also performed the insert songs used throughout the series, such as  used in episode one.

Episode list

References

External links
 

2012 anime television series debuts
2012 manga
Anime with original screenplays
Animeism
Aniplex
Seinen manga
Slice of life anime and manga
Square Enix franchises
Sunrise (company)